The Journal of Cleaner Production is a peer-reviewed academic journal covering transdisciplinary research on cleaner production. It is published by Elsevier. The job of editor-in-chief is shared jointly by Jiří Jaromír Klemeš (Brno University of Technology), Cecília Maria Villas Bôas de Almeida (Paulista University), and Yutao Wang (Fudan University). The former and founding editor-in-chief was Donald Huisingh (University of Tennessee).

The Journal of Cleaner Production serves as a transdisciplinary, international forum for the exchange of information and research concepts, policies, and technologies designed to help ensure progress towards making societies and regions more sustainable. It aims to encourage innovation and creativity, new and improved products, and the implementation of new, cleaner structures, systems, processes, products and services. It is also designed to stimulate the development and implementation of prevention oriented governmental policies and educational programmes.

References

External links 
 

Elsevier academic journals
Publications established in 1993
English-language journals
Environmental science journals
Journals published between 27 and 51 times per year